The 1903 Stanford football team represented Stanford University in the 1903 college football season and was coached by James F. Lanagan, a former Stanford baseball player, in his first season coaching the team.

Schedule

Game summaries

California
The 1903 Big Game was the last to be played on a neutral field in San Francisco. It ended in a 6–6 tie. Beginning with the 1904 Big Game, the game was alternated between the home field of each team.

References

Stanford
Stanford Cardinal football seasons
Stanford football